Robert Ionuț Grecu (born 2 June 1998) is a Romanian professional footballer who plays mainly as a right winger for Viitorul Dăești.

Club career

Steaua București
Robert Grecu played his first official game in Liga I in 2017, in a 2-1 win against Concordia Chiajna.

Career statistics

Club

References

External links
 
 

1998 births
Living people
Sportspeople from Pitești
Romanian footballers
Association football midfielders
Liga I players
FC Steaua București players
Liga II players
FC Argeș Pitești players
FC Viitorul Constanța players
FC Steaua II București players
FC Petrolul Ploiești players
ASC Daco-Getica București players
FC Astra Giurgiu players
Liga III players